The Aviadesign A-16 Sport Falcon is an American light-sport aircraft that was designed by Aviadesign, a certified aircraft modification company based in Camarillo, California. The A-16 was announced at Sun 'n Fun April 2006 and introduced at the LSA Expo held in Sebring, Florida in 2007. The aircraft was to be supplied as a complete ready-to-fly-aircraft.

Jane's Information Group reports that two prototypes were completed by 2006, but it is not clear if any other examples ever flew before the company went out of business.

Design and development
The aircraft was designed to comply with the US light-sport aircraft rules. It features a strut-braced high-wing, a two-seats-in-tandem enclosed cockpit under a bubble canopy, fixed tricycle landing gear and a single engine in pusher configuration.

The aircraft is made with a welded steel tubing airframe. Its  span wing employs a single strut per side. The standard engine for production examples was intended to be the  Rotax 912ULS four-stroke powerplant. Entry to the cockpit is via an airstair door.

The design is listed on the Federal Aviation Administration's list of accepted SLSAs, but as no longer in production.

Operational history
In March 2010 reviewer Dan Johnson reported on a test flight in the prototype:

Specifications (A-16)

References

External links
Former location of the company official website
Last official webpage for the design from 30 October 2010
Company website archives on Archive.org
Photograph of the prototype A-16

Light-sport aircraft
Single-engined pusher aircraft